The fifth season of Chicago Med, an American medical drama television series with executive producer Dick Wolf, and producers Michael Brandt, Peter Jankowski, Andrew Schneider and René Balcer (uncredited), was ordered on February 26, 2019. This season marks the death of cardiothoracic surgeon Ava Bekker portrayed by Norma Kuhling, and the departure of surgeon Connor Rodes portrayed by Colin Donnell as well as the arrival of Trauma Surgeon Crockett Marcel portrayed by Dominic Rains The season premiered on September 25, 2019.

On March 13, 2020, the production of the fifth season was suspended due to the COVID-19 pandemic.
This season also includes the series' 100th episode

Cast

Main characters
 Nick Gehlfuss as Dr. Will Halstead, Supervising Attending Emergency Physician
 Yaya DaCosta as Emergency Department Nurse April Sexton
 Torrey DeVitto as Dr. Natalie Manning, Emergency Medicine/Pediatrics Attending 
 Colin Donnell as Dr. Conor Rhodes, Attending Trauma Surgeon (Until episode 1)
 Brian Tee as LCDR Dr. Ethan Choi, Attending Emergency Physician
 Marlyne Barrett as Maggie Lockwood, RN, ED Charge Nurse
 Norma Kuhling as Dr. Ava Bekker, Cardiothoracic Surgery Attending (Until episode 1)
 S. Epatha Merkerson as Sharon Goodwin, Chief of Services
 Oliver Platt as Dr. Daniel Charles, Chief of Psychiatry
 Dominic Rains as Dr. Crockett Marcel (episode 2 onwards; guest, episode 1)

Recurring characters
 Brennan Brown as Dr. Sam Abrams, Attending Neurosurgeon 
 Ato Essandoh as Dr. Isidore Latham, Cardiothoracic Surgeon
 Molly Bernard as Elsa Curry, Student Doctor 
 Nate Santana as Dr. James Lanik, Chief of Trauma
 Roland Buck III as Dr. Noah Sexton, resident
 Jeremy Shouldis as Dr. Marty Peterson, Anesthesiologist 
 Casey Tutton as Emergency Department Nurse Monique Lawson
 Lorena Diaz as Emergency Department Nurse Doris
 Marie Tredway as Emergency Department Nurse Trinidad “Trini” Campos 
 Mia Park as Operating Room Nurse Beth Cole
 Marc Grapey as Peter Kalmick
 Adam Petchel as Tim Burke
 Paula Newsome as Caroline Charles
 Ian Harding as Phillip Davis
 Charles Malik Whitfield as Ben Campbell
 Jessy Schram as Dr. Hannah Asher, Obstetrics and Gynecology

Crossover guest stars
 LaRoyce Hawkins as Officer Kevin Atwater
 Jesse Spencer as Captain Matthew Casey
 Randy Flagler as Firefighter Harold Capp
 Anthony Ferraris as Firefighter Tony Ferraris
 Tracy Spiridakos as Detective Hailey Upton
 Jason Beghe as Sergeant Hank Voight
 Taylor Kinney as Lieutenant Kelly Severide
 Kara Killmer as Paramedic in Charge Sylvie Brett 
 David Eigenberg as Lieutenant Christopher Hermann
 Annie Ilonzeh as Paramedic Emily Foster 
 Eamonn Walker as Battalion Chief Wallace Boden 
 Jesse Lee Soffer as Detective Jay Halstead
 Patrick John Flueger as Officer Adam Ruzek
 Marina Squerciati as Officer Kim Burgess
 Lisseth Chavez as Officer Vanessa Rojas
 Amy Morton as Desk Sergeant Trudy Platt

Episodes

Production

On April 19, 2019, NBC announced that Colin Donnell (Dr. Connor Rhodes) and Norma Kuhling (Dr. Ava Bekker) would be departing the series due to creative reasons, but they would both appear in the season 5 premiere to wrap up their characters' storyline. The episode sees Connor depart Med after Ava kills herself in front of him. Series showrunners Andy Schneider and Diane Frolov said the scene in which Dr. Bekker takes her own life was the "ultimate revenge against the man that had rejected her." Her death pushes Connor to leave Med, as he will always be reminded of everything that happened. Schneider and Frolov confirmed that the ending means Donnell could return to the show in the future.

The season premiere also begins several ongoing storylines for the show's regulars. Dr. Natalie Manning (Torrey DeVitto) will be dealing with a traumatic brain injury she sustained in the season 4 finale. A time gap occurs between the first and second episodes, in which Dr. Manning recovers and returns to work. Schneider and Frolov said the injury would prompt questions about Dr. Manning's ability to do her job well. They also confirmed that De. Manning's memory will return and the audience will find out what she was planning on telling Dr. Halstead before the crash. 

Following a pregnancy scare for Dr. Choi (Brian Tee) and Nurse April Sexton (Yaya DaCosta) in the first episode, the idea of having a child is "definitely part of their storyline." Meanwhile, Maggie Lockwood (Marlyne Barrett) is diagnosed with breast cancer and her treatment is a long-running storyline, which showcases new technology available to cancer patients. Frolov commented, "We hope women will see Maggie and relate to her, especially when she goes through the biopsy. Maybe they'll see her go through it and realize it's not as terrible as you'd imagine in your head — it's painless. That's what we were hopeful for, that seeing someone go through it will help reduce fear."

Dominic Rains joined the cast in the recurring role of Dr. Crockett Marcel, "a hard-partying doctor from Louisiana". He made his first appearance in the season premiere.

Crossover
In early September 2019, Chicago Fire showrunner Derek Haas confirmed a crossover event between Fire, Chicago Med and Chicago P.D.. Haas and producer Dick Wolf came up with the story, and Haas would write all three episodes, marking the first time he has written for Med since the spin-off episode "I Am the Apocalypse". Haas explained that the shows would be "intertwined" and there will be scenes that would make viewers think they are watching "a Med scene, but it's in the Fire hour." The plot revolves around "a mysterious illness", with Haas comparing it to The Poseidon Adventure or Independence Day, saying "where you've got a bunch of stories – cutting to one, cutting to another – and there's a mystery, both medical and criminal, going on that we’re trying to solve before it gets out of hand." The crossover begins in Fire'''s fourth episode, before leading into Med and P.D.'' on the same day.

Ratings

References

External links
 
 

2019 American television seasons
2020 American television seasons
Television productions suspended due to the COVID-19 pandemic
Chicago Med seasons